Forest Hill Cemetery is a cemetery in Memphis, Tennessee. It consists of three separate cemeteries: Forest Hill Cemetery Midtown, Forest Hill Cemetery East and Forest Hill Cemetery South.

History
Forest Hill Cemetery Midtown was established in 1888 and chartered in 1892. As of 1906, the cemetery comprised 180 acres and there were 1,300 interments.

A second location, Forest Hill Cemetery East, was established in 1961. A third location, Forest Hill Cemetery South, was established in 1962. The cemeteries are owned by Pennsylvania based StoneMor.

In 2021, WREG-TV investigated fines placed in 2020 and 2021 by the state against the cemeteries. The cemeteries received complaints and ten fines for poor maintenance, management and rodent infestation. The rodent infestation problem took place at the body preparation building from June 2020 to March 2021 at the Forest Hill Cemetery East location. There has been notable damage to memorials, including the memorials of John R. Brinkley and the Elks Rest monument.

The cemetery has various monuments, including one to the Benevolent and Protective Order of Elks.

Notable burials

 Estelle Axton (1918–2004), record executive and co-founder of Stax Records
 Packy Axton (1941–1974), American musician
 Bill Black (1926–1965), American bassist who worked with Elvis Presley
 James Blackwood (1919–2002), American gospel singer
 John R. Brinkley (1885–1945), charlatan physician and radio pioneer
 Christopher Byers (died 1993), victim of the West Memphis Three
 Walter Chandler (1887–1967), U.S. Representative from Tennessee and mayor of Memphis
 Clifford Davis (1897–1970), U.S. Representative from Tennessee
 Charlie Feathers (1932–1998), American musician
 Frank P. Gates (1895–1975), Mississippi architect
 John E. McCall (1859–1920), U.S. Representative from Tennessee and judge
 William Robert Moore (1830–1909), U.S. Representative from Tennessee and college founder
 Phoebe Omlie (1902–1975), American aviation pioneer
 Josiah Patterson (1837–1904), officer in Confederate States Army and U.S. Representative from Tennessee
 Malcolm R. Patterson (1861–1935), U.S. Representative from Tennessee and governor of Tennessee
 Margaret Polk (1922–1990), namesake of Memphis Belle
 Elvis Presley (1935–1977), American rock and roll artist and actor (his body was moved to Graceland shortly after burial)
 Frank Trimble (1840–1915), merchant and real estate businessman
 Kemmons Wilson (1913–2003), founder of the Holiday Inn hotel chain
 Luke Edward Wright (1846–1922), Governor-General of the Philippines and U.S. Secretary of War

See also
 List of cemeteries in Tennessee

References

External links
 Forest Hill Cemetery

External links

Cemeteries in Tennessee
1888 establishments in Tennessee